Gábor Kecskeméti (30 January 1912 – 23 September 1981) was a Hungarian gymnast. He competed in eight events at the 1936 Summer Olympics.

References

External links
 

1912 births
1981 deaths
Hungarian male artistic gymnasts
Olympic gymnasts of Hungary
Gymnasts at the 1936 Summer Olympics
People from Békés
Sportspeople from Békés County